Ondřej Sosenka (born 9 December 1975 in Prague) is a Czech professional cyclist who last rode for the UCI Professional Continental team PSK Whirlpool-Author. He won the Peace Race in 2002. He broke the five-year-old UCI hour record on 19 July 2005 in Moscow, Russia, riding  in one hour.

Biography
Sosenka was known as one of the largest professional cyclists competing in Europe. For his 2005-hour record attempt, he used a custom carbon fiber bicycle manufactured by Francesco Moser cycles.

In 2006, he won the Czech Republic national time trial championships and following this the two-man time trial Duo Normand with Radek Blahut.

Doping

In June 2008, he tested positive for the banned stimulant methamphetamine and its metabolites during his national time trial championships, and received a suspension which ended his career.

Major Results

1997
1st Stage 3 Hessen-Rundfahrt
3rd Liège–Bastogne–Liège U23
1998
National Road Championships
1st  Time trial
3rd Road race
1999
1st  Overall Okolo Slovenska
2000
1st  Time trial, National Road Championships
1st Stage 10 Peace Race
2001
1st  Overall Course de Solidarność et des Champions Olympiques
1st Stage 4b
1st  Overall Tour de Pologne
1st Stage 8
1st  Time trial, National Road Championships
2002
1st  Overall Peace Race
1st Stages 4 & 10
1st Stage 5 Course de Solidarność et des Champions Olympiques
3rd Overall Tour de Luxembourg
5th Overall Tour de Pologne
1st Stage 8 
National Road Championships
1st  Time trial
3rd Road race
2003
1st  Overall Okolo Slovenska
1st Stages 4 & 5 (ITT)
2nd Overall Peace Race
1st Stage 4
3rd Time trial, National Road Championships
9th Overall Tour de Suisse
2004
1st  Overall Tour de Pologne
1st Stage 8 (ITT)
3rd Firenze–Pistoia
10th Overall Vuelta a Burgos
10th Milano–Torino
National Road Championships
1st  Road race
2nd Time trial
2005
1st  Time trial, National Road Championships
1st Stage 3b Tour of Belgium (ITT)
1st Chrono des Nations
5th Overall International UNIQA Classic
1st Prologue
UCI hour record 49.700 km
2006
1st  Time trial, National Road Championships
1st Duo Normand (with Radek Blahut)
2007
9th Duo Normand (with Jan Novák)

See also
List of doping cases in cycling

References

External links
 Official webpage Ondřej Sosenka

 
 
 
 

Czech male cyclists
Sportspeople from Prague
1975 births
Living people
Olympic cyclists of the Czech Republic
Cyclists at the 2004 Summer Olympics
Czech sportspeople in doping cases
Doping cases in cycling